Caroline Gilchrist Rhea (born April 13, 1964) is a Canadian actress and stand-up comedian, who is best known for her role as Linda Flynn-Fletcher, Betty Jo Flynn and additional voices from the Disney Channel and Disney XD animated series Phineas and Ferb and Hilda Spellman on the ABC series Sabrina the Teenage Witch.

She has performed numerous comedy specials, including three one-hour standup specials for HBO, Showtime, and Bravo. She is also known as the voice of Linda Flynn-Fletcher on the Disney Channel series Phineas and Ferb and as a regular on Hollywood Squares with her friend Whoopi Goldberg. Rhea was chosen by Rosie O'Donnell as the new hostess of her syndicated talk show (renamed The Caroline Rhea Show) and hosted the reality television show The Biggest Loser on NBC for the first three seasons. She appeared regularly on ABC's Match Game with Alec Baldwin from 2016 to 2020. She would return to Disney Channel on the series Sydney to the Max, playing the role of Grandma Judy.

Early life
Rhea was born and raised in Westmount, Quebec, the daughter of Margery and David Rhea, an obstetrician and gynecologist, respectively. She has two sisters, Cynthia and Celia. She attended The Study, an all-girls private school in Westmount, Quebec; Dalhousie University in Nova Scotia; and the University of Arizona.

Career

Standup 

Rhea moved to New York in 1986 to pursue a career as a comedian and actress. She began performing at venues like Catch a Rising Star and The Comic Strip, where she performed along with comedians including Chris Rock, Louis C.K., Dave Attell, Marc Maron, and Jim Gaffigan. She made her first filmed standup appearances on MTV's Half-Hour Comedy Hour, Comic Strip Live, and Caroline's Comedy Hour.

Rhea was given a one-hour special for HBO, called One Night Stand. She followed it up with Rhea's Anatomy, her one-hour special for Bravo, and Give Me My Remote for Showtime.

Film and television 
After finding success in New York as a comedian, Caroline moved to Los Angeles to pursue an acting career in Hollywood, debuting on NBC's television series Pride & Joy, where she co-starred with Jeremy Piven. She later gained widespread fame for her role as Aunt Hilda on the ABC (and later, The WB) series Sabrina the Teenage Witch and for her recurring role on the latest incarnation of Hollywood Squares.

Rhea is also well known for her role as Linda Flynn-Fletcher on the long-running Disney show Phineas and Ferb; for her syndicated daytime talk show, The Caroline Rhea Show; as the original host of The Biggest Loser on NBC; and for playing Noleta Nethercott on the TV series Sordid Lives: The Series for Logo, which has been rebooted as a feature called A Very Sordid Wedding.

In 2004, she appeared in the cult classics Mom's Got a Date with a Vampire and Christmas with the Kranks. In 2005, Rhea appeared in The Perfect Man, playing a co-worker of Jean (Heather Locklear) and had a recurring role on the hit Disney Channel Original Series, The Suite Life of Zack & Cody as Ilsa Shickelgubermeiger-Von Helsing der Keppelugerhofer, an inspector turned manager of the rival hotel. In 2007, she starred in the original Lifetime Television movie To Be Fat Like Me opposite Kaley Cuoco and in the Fox animated series Two Dreadful Children.

In 2008, Rhea starred alongside Justin Guarini and Mircea Monroe in the MarVista Entertainment production of Fast Girl. In 2013, Rhea hosted a travelling live stage show version of the game show Family Feud that toured fairs in the US and Canada, including the Calgary Stampede. In 2017, she began a recurring role on ABC's revival of Match Game.She appeared in 21 episodes, her last airing in October 2020.

Rhea has competed on Bravo's Celebrity Poker Showdown and GSN's World Series of Blackjack, and has also done a live webcast with author Meg Cabot.

In 2018, Rhea began hosting Caroline & Friends on GSN. The series features funny videos of animals and children. The studio audience votes for the best video from ones chosen by Rhea and her two guest comedian co-hosts. The show lasted for one season.

In 2019, Rhea began appearing as Judy, the grandmother, in the Disney Channel sitcom Sydney to the Max, which premiered January 25, 2019 and ran for three seasons until November 2021. The role did get her a spot amongst a team of contemporary moms on the network for an episode of Celebrity Family Feud which aired in 2020.

Charity work 

Rhea has appeared at Comic Relief as well as the Ms. Foundation's "Women of Comedy from Caroline's Comedy Club". She appeared as a contestant in 2001 on a special edition of Who Wants to Be a Millionaire, winning $125,000 for her charity.

Personal life
Rhea and her former partner, comedian Costaki Economopoulos, have a daughter, Ava (born October 2008).

Rhea's parents were diagnosed with cancer one week apart. Her mother, Margery, was diagnosed with breast cancer and her dad, David, with lung cancer. David, an OB/GYN, died 10 months later; Margery lived another six years.

Filmography

Film

Television

See also
 List of Quebec comedians
 List of Canadian comedians

References

External links

CarolineRhea.com

TV.com - The Caroline Rhea Show 

1964 births
20th-century Canadian actresses
21st-century Canadian actresses
Actresses from Quebec
Anglophone Quebec people
Canadian expatriate actresses in the United States
Canadian film actresses
Canadian stand-up comedians
Canadian television actresses
Canadian sketch comedians
Canadian television talk show hosts
Canadian voice actresses
Canadian women comedians
Comedians from Quebec
Dalhousie University alumni
Living people
People from Westmount, Quebec
University of Arizona alumni